William Elliott (15 November 1842 – 1891) was an English cricketer. Elliott was a right-handed batsman who bowled right-arm fast. He was born at Bulwell, Nottinghamshire.

Elliott made his first-class debut for Richard Daft's XI against a United North of England Eleven at the Recreation Ground, Holbeck in 1870. The following season he made two first-class appearances for Nottinghamshire against Gloucestershire at Clifton College, and Surrey at The Oval. He scored a total of 12 runs in his three first-class appearances, as well as taking two wickets.

References

External links
William Elliott at ESPNcricinfo
William Elliott at CricketArchive

1842 births
1891 deaths
People from Bulwell
Cricketers from Nottinghamshire
English cricketers
Nottinghamshire cricketers
R. Daft's XI cricketers